Bone Brothers IV is a mixtape from the American hip-hop duo Bone Brothers released by Sicness.net. Both members Bizzy Bone and Layzie Bone have stated they did not know this project would be released, and that the material is from years back.

Track listing

References
https://www.amazon.com/Bone-Brothers-IV-Thugs/dp/B004KRQEZ4

2011 albums
Bone Brothers albums